Eday London Airport  is located on Eday in Orkney, Scotland. As it is close to the Bay of London it is known locally as just London Airport. The Bay of London may have been so called because of puffins breeding there: Old Norse lundi = "puffin", Old Norse á Lundunum = "at the puffins".

Eday Aerodrome has a CAA Ordinary Licence (Number P573) that allows flights for the public transport of passengers or for flying instruction as authorised by the licensee (Orkney Islands Council). The aerodrome is not licensed for night use.

Airline and destinations

References

External links
North Island Airports at Orkney Islands Council
Flickr image

Airports in Orkney
Eday